No Doubt About It may refer to:

Albums
No Doubt About It (album) or the title song (see below), by Neal McCoy, 1993
No Doubt About It, by Terri Gibbs, 2002

Songs
 "No Doubt About It", by The Esquires, 1968
 "No Doubt About It", by The J. Geils Band from Ladies Invited, 1973
 "No Doubt About It", by Hot Chocolate, 1980
 "No Doubt About It", by the Bay City Rollers from Ricochet, 1981
 "No Doubt About It", by Wipers from Follow Blind, 1987 
 "No Doubt About It", by Neal McCoy, 1993
 "No Doubt About It", by Paul Carrack from I Know That Name, 2008
 "No Doubt About It", by Jussie Smollett and Pitbull from Empire: Original Soundtrack Season 2 Volume 1, 2015
 "No Doubt About It", by ABBA, from Voyage, 2021

See also
Ain't No Doubt About It (disambiguation)